Fernando Rojas (born Carlos Fernando Rojas on September 4, 1968) is a Colombian-American producer, composer, writer, and pianist. He gained popularity in 2001 with his original song "Melody in the Key of Love," which received television airtime and promotion on MTV internationally. In 2003, he represented the United States of America with his "In The Night I'll Be Dreaming of You" in the 44th annual Viña del Mar International Song Festival in Chile. Rojas's work as a film producer includes development of an independent film, "Prince of Paupers," based on the memoirs of Guillermo Descalzi, who rose to prominence as the leading political commentator for the Spanish international networks Telemundo and Univision. Rojas also is vice-president of Flamingo Digital Records, a record company which he founded in 1997.

Early life
Fernando de Rojas was born in Bogota, Colombia in 1968, to a musical family with two sisters. His entire family has migrated to New York City in 1981, when he was just thirteen years old, and they have resided in different areas of the city ever since. Fernando currently lives in Uptown Manhattan, where he continues to develop projects in both film and music.

Film career

Maria Full of Grace
Fernando worked with the production team, including producer Paul Mezey and director Joshua Marston, for the presentation of the 2004 drama film Maria Full of Grace at the Cartagena Film Festival. The film was greatly successful at the festival, winning awards including the Colombian Cinema Award for best actress (Catalina Moreno) and the Special Jury Prize for directing (Joshua Marston). The film was then nominated for an Academy Award and a Screen Actors Guild Award for Best Performance by an Actress in a Leading Role (Catalina Moreno).

Prince of Paupers
Rojas spearheaded production for a film, Prince of Paupers, chronicling the life of internationally acclaimed newscaster Guillermo Descalizis. The film's followed the timeline of Descalizi's life, from his fall from fame, his subsequent life as a homeless man, and his gradual and triumphant reascension to prominence. The film was co-produced by Audit Trail, Inc., whose credits include post-production for the Oscar-winning film Monster (2003 film). Part of the proceeds were to be donated to the memorial fund of Dick York, in celebration of the iconic American actor's philanthropy work. At this point, production for the film has been placed on hold due to unexplained political opposition.

Music career

Flamingo Digital Records
In 1997, Rojas created and began developing his own record label, Flamingo Digital Records. With his own extended play and singles, he became the first artist produced under this new record company. The first single from Flamingo Digital was Rojas's own Melody In The Key of Love, which was promoted on an infomercial on Spanish television networks. Currently, the label is at work on new projects for 2015 and 2016, though none have been announced yet.

Viña del Mar International Song Festival
Fernando was selected to compete in the Viña del Mar International Song Festival in 2003, representing the United States of America. For the festival, he composed and produced an original song, entitled, "In The Night I'll Be Dreaming of You." The song was performed by a full orchestra and soprano Gabrielle Sterbenz as featured vocalist. In addition to an all-English version, a bilingual English-Spanish version was also performed. Rojas was present and served as the pianist at the event, and he oversaw all production and orchestration of the song throughout the process.

Discography
EP's
Melody in the Key of Love (2014)

Singles
Melody in the Key of Love (2005) ~ A commercial for the spans
Storybook Romance'' (2012)El Camino De La Vida (2013)Entre Dos Aguas'' (2014)

Political work

2016 United States presidential campaign
Fernando aided in the advancement of Donald Trump in the 2016 U.S. presidential campaign by writing directly to British politician Nigel Farage on August 5, 2016, beckoning him to contact Trump for a collaborative meeting. Within a week of Rojas's contact, Farage was invited to a Trump rally, where he then appeared, showing his support for the candidate.

Additionally, Rojas's record label was instrumental in producing a 30-second television/internet commercial in support of the Trump 2016 campaign. The commercial featured Rojas's song, "In The Night I'll Be Dreaming of You," the same song used at the Viña del Mar International Song Festival. The commercial garnered thousands of views in a matter of days, and focused on Trump's work in support of women and families.

Awards and honors

References

Further reading
 http://revistamomentos.co/fernando-rojas-rothschild-creo-en-la-vision-futurista-del-presidente-trump/

1968 births
Living people
American film producers
American male composers
20th-century American composers
American male writers
Colombian emigrants to the United States
20th-century American pianists
American male pianists
21st-century American pianists
20th-century American male musicians
21st-century American male musicians